Harry Jonas "Simon" Mynott (4 June 1876 – 2 January 1924) was a New Zealand rugby union player. A first five-eighth, Mynott represented  at a provincial level, and was a member of the New Zealand national side, the All Blacks, from 1905 to 1910. Mynott played 39 matches for the All Blacks, twice as captain. He played in  eight internationals including the Match of the Century against Wales. In all he scored 58 points for the team, including 18 tries. Mynott went on to serve as a Taranaki selector between 1910 and 1914, and an All Black selector in 1913.

Mynott died in New Plymouth on 2 January 1924, and was buried at Te Henui Cemetery.

References

1876 births
1924 deaths
Rugby union players from Auckland
New Zealand rugby union players
New Zealand international rugby union players
Taranaki rugby union players
Rugby union fly-halves
Burials at Te Henui Cemetery